Michel Sogny piano method is a system of teaching music and piano created by French pianist, composer and teacher Michel Sogny.

Sogny’s methodology is taught at his schools in Paris and Geneva. Since 1974, more than 20,000 students are mastering piano by Sogny’s method. 

The method consists of two main components: Didactic works - Prolégomènes, which represent small exercises. Polégomènes develop the perception of musical symphony and sound. The second direction consists of the cycle of etudes, where the concentration is on development of technical skills, as hand gestures and positions.

One of Sogny’s students, who started piano practice already as an adult, was a French language professor Michel Paris. After completing Sogny’s 4-year methodology course, at the age of 30 she performed a solo concert at Théâtre des Champs-Élysée with the patronage of Ministry of Culture.

Michel Sogny’s another successful student was Claudine Zévaco, who performed at Théâtre des Champs-Élysée in 1983 and 1984. 

In 1981, the Senate formally addressed the Minister of Culture, Jack Lang to discuss the introduction of Michel Song's methodology throughout whole France.

Michel Sogny founded SOS Talents Foundation. The main goal of the foundation is to support talented young musicians from economically poor backgrounds (who mostly come from Eastern European countries).  Pianists who are the nominees of the foundation, follow Sogny’s piano method and perform their program during various concerts.  

The first gala concert of SOS Talents Foundation was held in 2001 at the Marcel Dassault Palace in Paris, with patronage of Serge and Nicole Dassault, participants included, Sogny’s students Yana Vassileva and Khatia Buniatishvili. Same year at the Théàtre des Champs-Élysées performed: Elisso Bolkvadze, Yana Vassilieva, Khatia Buniatishvili and her sister Gvantsa.

References

External links 
 Michel Sogny Official Website
 Michel Sogny Academy
 Michel Sogny Personal Website
 SOS Talents Foundation
 Works at Artchipel

Music education